Death receptor 4 (DR4), also known as TRAIL receptor 1 (TRAILR1) and tumor necrosis factor receptor superfamily member 10A (TNFRSF10A), is a cell surface receptor of the TNF-receptor superfamily that binds TRAIL and mediates apoptosis.

Function 
The protein encoded by this gene is a member of the TNF-receptor superfamily. This receptor is activated by tumor necrosis factor-related apoptosis inducing ligand (TNFSF10/TRAIL), and thus transduces cell death signal and induces cell apoptosis.

Studies with FADD-deficient mice suggested that FADD, a death domain containing adaptor protein, is required for the apoptosis mediated by this protein.

Interactions
TNFRSF10A has been shown to interact with DAP3.

References

Further reading

TNF receptor family
Clusters of differentiation